Reza Ghandipour (born in Behbahan on 13 January 2006) is a football player from Iran. Ghandipour started his football career in Behbahan Railway Club and then joined Sepahan Football Club. He is currently a member of Football Club Paykan F.C. Ghandipour also became the top scorer of the Junior Premier League and participated in the national youth football team of Iran and is now a member of the national youth football of Iran. Reza was selected as the best player of the KAFA tournament.

References

External links

Reza Ghandipour on Soccer Wiki
Reza Ghandipour on metrica

Living people
2006 births
Iranian footballers
People from Behbahan
Paykan F.C. players